Route nationale 1 (RN 1) is a primary highway in Madagascar of 149 km, running from Analavory, Miarinarivo to Tsiroanomandidy. It crosses the region of Bongolava and Analamanga

Selected locations on route
(east to west)
Antananarivo 
Analavory - (intersection with RN 1b and RN 43)
Tsiroanomandidy  - (intersection with RN 1a to Maintirano and RN 1b)
Belobaka

See also
List of roads in Madagascar
Transport in Madagascar

References

Roads in Analamanga
Roads in Bongolava
Roads in Madagascar